Virginie Ujlaky (born February 13, 1984 in Neuilly-sur-Seine) is a Hungarian fencer. She has a dual citizenship of France and Hungary. 

She won the Junior World Fencing Championships for France in 2004. She was team European champion with Hungary in 2007. She also represented Hungary at the 2008 Summer Olympics in the women's team foil event, where they finished fourth.

References

1984 births
Living people
Hungarian female foil fencers
French female foil fencers
Olympic fencers of Hungary
Fencers at the 2008 Summer Olympics
Sportspeople from Neuilly-sur-Seine
21st-century Hungarian women